Carlos Octavio Villanueva López (born 7 April 1994) is a Mexican professional footballer who plays as a defender.

Club career
Today he is one of the young promises of the Club Deportivo Guadalajara but has played only a few minutes with the first team.

Honours
Guadalajara
Copa MX: Apertura 2015
Supercopa MX: 2016

Necaxa
Supercopa MX: 2018

References

External links

Footballers from Michoacán
People from Uruapan
C.D. Guadalajara footballers
1994 births
Living people
Mexican footballers
Association football defenders